The Challenge Tour 2018/2019 was a series of snooker tournaments that took place during the 2018–19 season. It was a second-tier tour for players not on the main World Snooker Tour. The top two players in the final rankings earned a two-year card to the World Snooker Tour for 2019–20.

Brandon Sargeant was certain of his place in the top two even before the final event. Prior to the draw for the final event, Sargeant led the rankings and only David Grace and Mitchell Mann could catch him. Sargeant could only drop to third if both Grace and Mann reached the final. However, when Grace and Mann were drawn in the same half of the draw, Sargeant was guaranteed his place in the top two. Grace guaranteed his place in the top two after his two nearest challengers, Mann and David Lilley, both lost on the first day of the final event.

After the season had been finished, additional places became available on the main tour for 2019/2020 season and it was decided that an extra tour place would be given to the third placed player on the ranking list, Mitchell Mann.

Format
Each event had a maximum field of 64. The leading 64 players in the 2018 Q School Order of Merit, excluding the 12 who qualified for the main tour, were automatically eligible to play. If some of these did not enter, eight wildcards became eligible and if there are still less than 64 entries, players outside the top-64 in the Q School Order of Merit could enter.

All matches were over five frames. The winner of each event received prize money of £2,000 out of a total of £10,000. The runner-up received £1,000, semi-finalists £700, quarter-finalists £500, last-16 losers £200 and last-32 losers £125.

Schedule

Source:

The event at Riga was planned for two days, but with only 25 entries, it was played in a single day.

Eligible players
The leading 64 players in the 2018 Q School Order of Merit, excluding the 12 who qualified for the main tour, were automatically eligible to play:

  Farakh Ajaib
  Simon Bedford
  James Cahill
  Greg Casey
  Shane Castle
  Jamie Cope
  David Craggs
  Jeff Cundy
  Jamie Curtis-Barrett
  Matthew Day
  Lee Dae-gyu
  Peter Devlin
  Himanshu Dinesh Jain
  Adam Duffy
  Adam Edge
  Dylan Emery
  Leo Fernandez
  John Foster
  Felix Frede
  David Grace
  Brandon Hall
  Steven Hallworth
  Ben Hancorn
  Hu Hao
  Kristján Helgason
  Andy Hicks
  Anthony Jeffers
  Liu Jiaming
  Kuldesh Johal
  Michael Judge
  Ning Kang
  David Lilley
  Callum Lloyd
  Sean Maddocks
  Mitchell Mann
  Jamie McArdle
  Geng Mingqi
  Jake Nicholson
  Heikki Niva
  Brian Ochoiski
  Phil O'Kane
  Jamie O'Neill
  Jackson Page
  Fraser Patrick
  Barry Pinches
  Haydon Pinhey
  Andreas Ploner
  Dechawat Poomjaeng
  Laxman Rawat
  Chae Ross
  Brandon Sargeant
  Luke Simmonds
  Andrew Smith
  Ma Tingpeng
  Lucky Vatnani
  Joel Walker
  Charlie Walters
  Patrick Whelan
  Sydney Wilson
  Fang Xiongman
  Wang Yuchen
  Long Zehuang
  Wang Zepeng
  Chen Zhe

Rankings
The leaders in the rankings were:

Source:

Players in the qualifying places are shown in green. Initially two qualifying places were available but a third place was allocated after the end of the season.

References

Q Tour
2018 in snooker
2019 in snooker